The CrossCountry NE–SW route is a long-distance rail route in England.

History
The Birmingham–Bristol section was built as the Birmingham and Gloucester and Bristol and Gloucester Railways before joining the Midland Railway, the southern forerunner to the cross-country route. From Birmingham to the north-northeast, the line had three separately owned sections, namely the:
Birmingham and Derby Junction Railway to Derby, thence the
North Midland Railway to Leeds, thence the 
York and North Midland Railway.

From the Labour Government's nationalisation in 1948 until privatisation in 1990, the route ran through all six regions of British Rail but had timetabling priority in none of them. Therefore the services were poorly promoted and thus not always well-patronised.

Most Derby–Nottingham local passenger trains were taken over by diesel units from 14 April 1958, taking about 34 minutes between the two cities.

In the 1990s most services were operated by British Rail's InterCity business unit. As part of the privatisation of British Rail, these were taken over by Virgin CrossCountry in 1997, with the Class 47 hauled Mark 2 and High Speed Train sets replaced by Class 220 and Class 221 diesel multiple units in the early 2000s.

The use of the route for freight has decreased, because of the bulk of haulage switching to roads and the building of the M5, M6 and M1 motorways.

Abortive British Rail proposals for complete electrification
In the 1960s the route was considered for electrification. In the early 1980s, electrification was again discussed at length and documentation for various proposals was produced in 1981. This would have been particularly beneficial for climbing the Lickey Incline between Cheltenham and Birmingham, as many of the early diesels were under-powered. In 1977 the Parliamentary Select Committee on Nationalised Industries recommended considering electrification of more of Britain's rail network, and by 1979 BR presented a range of options that included electrifying the cross-country route by 2000. Under the governments that succeeded the 1976–79 Labour government, the proposal was not implemented.

Route 

The route is well connected, and aside from its own alignment it uses parts of the South Wales Main Line, Midland Main Line, Swinton–Doncaster line, and the East Coast Main Line. Major cities and towns served along the route include:
Bristol
Cheltenham
Birmingham
Tamworth
Derby
Sheffield
Leeds
York

Nominal start-point at Derby
Milepost zero for the main predecessor Derby to Bristol route has always been Derby, hence a train travelling the whole route starts out going "up" then becomes "down".

Electrification 
However, the electrification programme was severely cut back in July 2017. , Network Rail is working on the section between York and Church Fenton. The rest of the section between Leeds and York has electrification planned as part of the Transpennine Route Upgrade, which itself is part of the Integrated Rail Plan for the North and Midlands. This plan includes full Midland Main Line electrification and upgrades.

Services 
Most long-distance services on the route are operated by Class 220/221 Voyagers, although a few services operate using High Speed Trains.

See also 
Rail services in the West of England
Transport in Wales
Virgin CrossCountry
CrossCountry
Tees–Exe line

Notes

References

Railway lines in the East Midlands
Railway lines in South West England
Railway lines in Yorkshire and the Humber
Railway lines in the West Midlands (region)
Main inter-regional railway lines in Great Britain